Molongum is a genus of plant in the family Apocynaceae first described as a genus in 1948. It is native to  South America.

Species
 Molongum laxum (Benth.) Pichon - Colombia, Venezuela, NW Brazil
 Molongum lucidum (Kunth) Zarucchi - Colombia, Venezuela, NW Brazil
 Molongum zschokkeiforme (Markgr.) Pichon - NW Brazil

formerly included
Molongum macrophyllum (Müll.Arg.) Pichon = Spongiosperma macrophyllum (Müll.Arg.) Zarucchi

References

Apocynaceae genera
Rauvolfioideae